Pat Campbell (born April 28, 1977 in Niagara Falls, Ontario) is a former professional indoor lacrosse goaltender who played for the Toronto Rock, Columbus Landsharks, Rochester Knighthawks, Calgary Roughnecks, and Edmonton Rush in the National Lacrosse League. In his NLL career, he won the Champion's Cup three times with the Rock (1999, 2000, 2011) and once with the Roughnecks (2009).  He was also the goalie for Brock University and won four straight Canadian University Field Lacrosse Association championships.

In 2007, Campbell was diagnosed with Crohn's disease, which caused him to miss half of the NLL season.

Campbell, who studied computer programming at Niagara College, launched a first-person lacrosse video game called Shooter Lacrosse for the iOS platform on March 3, 2012.

References

1977 births
Living people
Calgary Roughnecks players
Canadian lacrosse players
Columbus Landsharks players
Edmonton Rush players
Lacrosse goaltenders
Lacrosse people from Ontario
Rochester Knighthawks players
Sportspeople from Niagara Falls, Ontario
Toronto Rock players
Brock University alumni
People with Crohn's disease
Brock University athletics